This article contains a comprehensive collection of information related to recordings by American soul and funk musician, Isaac Hayes.

Albums

Studio albums

1960s–1970s

1980s–1990s

Live albums

Compilation albums

Soundtrack albums

Singles

1960s–1970s

1980s–1990s

As sideman
With Otis Redding
 Otis Blue: Otis Redding Sings Soul (Stax Records, 1965)
 The Soul Album (Stax Records, 1966)
 Complete & Unbelievable: The Otis Redding Dictionary of Soul (Stax Records, 1966)
 King & Queen (Stax Records, 1967)
 The Dock of the Bay (Stax Records, 1968)
With Wilson Pickett
 The Exciting Wilson Pickett (Atlantic Records, 1966)
With Donald Byrd and 125th Street, N.Y.C.
 Love Byrd (Elektra Records, 1981)
 Words, Sounds, Colors and Shapes (Elektra Records, 1982)
With Linda Clifford
 I'm Yours (RSO Records, 1980)
With Albert King
 Born Under a Bad Sign (Stax Records, 1967)
With William Bell
 The Soul of a Bell (Stax Records, 1967)
With Dionne Warwick
 No Night So Long (Arista Records, 1980)
With Rufus Thomas
 Do The Funky Chicken (Stax Records, 1970)
With Eddie Floyd
 Knock on Wood (Stax Records, 1967)

References

Discographies of American artists
Rhythm and blues discographies
Soul music discographies